Current list of the members of the Senate of Barbados:

Government Senators
According to the Constitution of Barbados, twelve (12) Senators shall be appointed by the President, on the advice of the Prime Minister. On January 24, 2022, days after the 2022 election, Prime Minister Mia Mottley announced her intention to nominate the following persons to sit as Government Senators:

Independent Senators
The Constitution normally provides for the appointment of seven (7) individuals to sit in the Senate, appointed by the President in his own discretion, i.e. Independent Senators. The following persons were sworn in by Dame Sandra Mason on February 1, 2022. The final 2 senators were sworn in April 8, 2022, in lieu of no opposition leader to appoint 2 opposition senators.

Opposition Senators

See also 
List of presidents of the Senate of Barbados

References 

Barbados Government Information Service
The Barbados Parliament

Main
Senate
Barbados